Justin Lamoureux (born August 26, 1976 in Red Bank, New Jersey) is a Canadian snowboarder, specializing in the halfpipe event.

Lamoureux made his World Cup debut in December 1997 at Whistler, Canada. His first, and to date, only,  World Cup podium came in December 2002 when he won bronze in Stoneham.

Lamoureux's best World Cup season thus far came in 2010, when he placed 1st overall in the halfpipe standings. He has competed at four FIS Snowboarding World Championships, including winning a silver medal in the halfpipe in 2005.

Lamoureux competed at the 2006 Winter Olympics, the halfpipe. He finished 41st in the first round and 15th in the second, leaving him 21st overall, and not advancing to the final.  In 2010, Lamoureaux had laser vision correction with LASIK MD.

Lamoureaux was also selected as a member of the Canadian team for the 2010 Winter Olympics.

World Cup Podiums

References

External links
 
 

1976 births
Living people
Olympic snowboarders of Canada
Snowboarders at the 2006 Winter Olympics
Snowboarders at the 2010 Winter Olympics
People from Red Bank, New Jersey
Canadian male snowboarders